Social Idea Movement (Movimento Idea Sociale, MIS) is an Italian neo-fascist political party.

It was founded in 2004 by a split of the Tricolour Flame party. Its leader was, until his death Pino Rauti, former leader of the Italian Social Movement and founder of Tricolour Flame.
Currently the leader of party is Raffaele Bruno.

In the general elections of 2013 MIS presented itself as Italian Missinian Refoundation (Rifondazione Missina Italiana) only in Campania, getting only 0.01% of vote for the Chamber and 0.00 of vote for the Senate.

Election results

2004 establishments in Italy
Neo-fascist organisations in Italy
Political parties established in 2004
Anti-Islam sentiment in Italy
Nationalist parties in Italy
Eurosceptic parties in Italy